Book III is a compilation album by Brotha Lynch Hung, the third and final in a series released throughout 2002 that began with Appearances: Book 1. The tracks are compiled from Lynch's studio albums and other artists' albums he featured on.

Track listing

References

2002 compilation albums
Brotha Lynch Hung albums
Horrorcore compilation albums